Thalia Theatre and Thalia Theater may refer to:

 Thalia Theater (Hamburg), in Germany
 Thalia Theatre (Paramaribo), in Suriname
 Thalia-Theater (Wuppertal), in Germany
 Thalia Theater, Symphony Space, in New York City, U.S.
 Bowery Theatre, New York City, U.S., formerly Thalia Theatre

See also
 Thalia (disambiguation)
 Thalia (Muse), the muse of comedy, for whom the above theaters are named
 Thalias Kompagnons, a puppet theatre in Nuremberg, Germany